Viner is a surname. Notable people with the surname include:

Brian Viner (born 1961), English journalist
Charles Viner (jurist), British legal writer
Charles Viner (1812–1906), British philatelist
Cliff Viner (born 1949), American businessman 
Emily Viner, Australian mountain bike orienteer
Giuseppe Viner (1875–1925), Italian painter
Horace Viner (1880–1955), Welsh footballer
Ian Viner (born 1933), Australian politician
Irina Viner (born 1948), Russian rhythmic gymnastics coach
Jacob Viner (1892–1970), Canadian economist
Katharine Viner (born 1971), English journalist
Michael Viner (1944–2009), American film and record producer
Sir Robert Viner, 1st Baronet (1631–1688), English businessman and Lord Mayor of London
William Litton Viner (1790–1867), British organist and composer
William Samuel Viner (1881–1933), Australian chess master

See also
Vyner, another surname